Equus stenonis  is an extinct species of equine that lived in Western Eurasia during the Early Pleistocene epoch.

Description 
Specimens of Equus stenonis varied considerably in body size. The feet are monodactyl, the head is large and elongated and has an undulated top profile in side-view, the nasal notch is deeply incised. The braincase is flexed downward and is relatively small. The teeth have a v-shaped linguaflexid separating the metaconid and metastylid, similar to other "stenonines". The limb bones are relatively large and robust. The metapodial bones of the foot are proportionaly elongate and robust, with the central digit having a massive morphology, with a large v-shaped muscle scar.

Distribution 
Equus stenonis is known from remains found across Europe, from the Iberian Peninsula to Greece, as well as the Dmanisi site in Georgia, spanning part of the Early Pleistocene, the oldest remains dating to approximately 2.5 million years ago, while the youngest dates are uncertain, ranging from 1.8-.1.3 million years ago.

Taxonomy 
The species was first named in 1867, with the type specimen being IGF 560, a skull with a now lost associated mandible collected from Terranuova Bracciolini in Italy. Several subspecies have been named, including  E. stenonis vireti, E. stenonis guthi, E. stenonis pueblensis, E. stenonis olivolanus and E. stenonis stenonis, which likely represent different ecomorphotypes adapted to varying local conditions.

The African species Equus koobiforensis and E. oldowayensis are closely related to E. stenonis. E. koobiforensis and E. stenonis have  been proposed to be closely related to zebras.

Barron-Ortiz et al. (2019) resurrect the genus Allohippus for Equus stenonis based on the results of their cladistic analysis regarding the interrelationships of the genus Equus, though this was subsequently rejected by other authors.

References

Prehistoric mammals of Europe
Prehistoric mammals of Asia
Equus (genus)
Fossil taxa described in 1867